The 1993 ICF Canoe Sprint World Championships were held in Copenhagen, Denmark for the third time. The Danish city had hosted the event previously in 1950 and 1970.

The men's competition consisted of eight Canadian (single paddle, open boat) and nine kayak events. Five events were held for the women, all in kayak. This was the first championship following the breakup of the Soviet Union in 1991 and the first since Czechoslovakia broke up into the Czech Republic and Slovakia in early 1993.

This was the 25th championships in canoe sprint.

Medal summary

Men's

Canoe

Kayak

Women's

Kayak

Medals table

References
ICF medalists for Olympic and World Championships - Part 1: flatwater (now sprint): 1936-2007.
ICF medalists for Olympic and World Championships - Part 2: rest of flatwater (now sprint) and remaining canoeing disciplines: 1936-2007.

Icf Canoe Sprint World Championships, 1993
Icf Canoe Sprint World Championships, 1993
ICF Canoe Sprint World Championships
International sports competitions hosted by Denmark
Canoeing in Denmark